Komsomolsky District is an administrative and municipal district (raion), one of the twenty-one in Ivanovo Oblast, Russia. It is located in the northwest of the oblast. Its administrative center is the town of Komsomolsk. Population:   22,042 (2002 Census);  The population of Komsomolsk accounts for 42.9% of the district's total population.

Administrative and municipal status
The town of Komsomolsk serves as the administrative center of the district. Prior to the adoption of the Law #145-OZ On the Administrative-Territorial Division of Ivanovo Oblast in December 2010, it was administratively incorporated separately from the district. Municipally, Komsomolsk is incorporated within Komsomolsky Municipal District as Komsomolskoye Urban Settlement.

References

Notes

Sources

Districts of Ivanovo Oblast

